Shizuku (滴 or 雫) means "droplet". It may refer to:

Characters
 Shizuku, a character in the eroge video game Popotan
 Shizuku (Hunter × Hunter), a character in the manga and anime series Hunter × Hunter
 Shizuku (Omamori Himari), a character in the manga and anime series Omamori Himari

Given name
 Shizuku Fuji, a character in Battle Arena Toshinden 3
 Shizuku Hazuki, a character in New Game!
 Shizuku Hinomori, a character from the video game Hatsune Miku: Colorful Stage!
 Shizuku Kitayama, a character in the light novel and anime The Irregular at Magic High School
 Shizuku Mizutani, a main character in the manga My Little Monster
 Shizuku Mizuki, a character in the video game Chaos Wars
 , a character in the media project Nijigasaki High School Idol Club
 Shizuku Sakurai, a character in the anime and manga Candy Boy
 Shizuku Sangou, a character in the manga and anime Kämpfer
 Shizuku Tsukushima, a character in the manga and anime Mimi wo Sumaseba
 Shizuku Yamabushi, a character of Yuki Yuna is a Hero

Other
 Shizuku (song), a song by Japanese metal band Esprit D'Air
 Shizuku (video game), a Japanese adult visual novel by Leaf
 Shizuku-chan, a Japanese manga and anime series
 Shizuku, an album by the Japanese rock band Kagrra,
 Shizuku, the nickname for the GCOM-W satellite, part of the Global Change Observation Mission